San Luis is the capital city of San Luis Province in the Cuyo region of Argentina. It is also the seat of the Juan Martín de Pueyrredón Department.

City information 

Points of interest in the city include the Park of the Nations, the neoclassical cathedral, a number of museums, including the Dora Ochoa De Masramón Provincial Museum, and examples of colonial architecture. A number of landmarks honour the Argentine War of Independence, as well. Independence Park features an equestrian monument to General José de San Martín, liberator of Argentina, Chile and Perú. Nearby Pringles Plaza honours Colonel Juan Pascual Pringles, one of San Martín's chief adjutants and, briefly, Governor of San Luis Province.

Fishing in the nearby Lake Potrero de los Funes, and other locations, is also popular.

Transport
National Route 7 connects San Luis to Mendoza,  to the west, and Buenos Aires,  to the east.

History
San Luis was founded on August 25, 1594, by Luis Jufré de Loaysa y Meneses. The settlement was later abandoned, and was reestablished in 1632 by Martín García Oñez de Loyola as San Luis de Loyola Nueva Medina de Río Seco.

By the end of the 19th century, San Luis had 7,000 inhabitants, and in 1882 the Argentine Great Western Railway reached the city on its way to Chile. The following year, work began on the cathedral. The Governor's Executive Building, designed in French renaissance architecture, was completed in 1911.

Because the city is located at the part of the Sierras Grandes known as Punta de los Venados (Deer Point), the inhabitants of the city are called puntanos.

Geography

Climate
San Luis has a humid subtropical climate (Cwa, according to the Köppen climate classification) and it closely borders a semi-arid climate (BSk). Summers are hot and humid, and winters are cool and dry, with temperatures falling below  sometimes and snowfalls can occur occasionally.

Gallery

References

Notes

External links
Official Site (Spanish)

City info (English)
CuyoNoticias digital newspaper (Spanish-English)

Populated places in San Luis Province
Capitals of Argentine provinces
Populated places established in 1594
Cities in Argentina
Argentina
San Luis Province